Sideris is the surname of the following people

Surname
Anastasia Loukaitou-Sideris (born 1958), Greek-American academic
Giorgos Sideris (born 1938), Greek footballer
Nikolas Sideris (born 1977), Greek musician
Nikos Sideris (born 1952), Greek psychiatrist

Given name
Sideris Tasiadis (born in 1990), German slalom canoeist

See also
Sideri